Lucas Halangk (born 22 September 2003) is a German professional footballer who plays as a right back for  club Hallescher FC.

References

External links

2003 births
Living people
German footballers
Association football fullbacks
1. FC Magdeburg players
Hallescher FC players
3. Liga players
21st-century German people